The Ganagobie is a single place, parasol wing homebuilt aircraft that was built by Willam and James Lobet, first flying in 1953.

Design and development
The first example was built in Lille, France using a 1930 Clerget engine, but was abandoned due to replacement engine availability after the first 23 hours of flight. Power was from a Poinsard engine. It was marketed as a plans-built homebuilt aircraft by Falconar Avia.

The aircraft is a single place, strut-braced parasol winged design, with conventional landing gear. The all-wood fuselage with plywood covering has a diamond shaped cross-section. The dual wooden spar wings have aircraft fabric covering. A fuel tank is mounted in each wing root.

Variants
Ganagobiefirst flown in 1952 powered by a Clerget engine.
Ganagobie 02 the first aircraft re-engined with an engine from a target drone.
Ganagobie 3 A second aircraft built by Mr. La Rue Smith in Alberta, Canada, powered by a  McCulloch O-90 or  Continental A40.
Ganagobie 4An ultra-light version built using weight saving techniques and Okoumé Mahogany, powered by a  Nelson H-63
Ganagobie 05A developed version typically powered by a  Limbach SL1700D
Ganagobie Mousebirdan updated design developed for New Zealand regulations.

Aircraft on display
A Nelson H-63-CP powered example of the Ganaboie, built by Haydon L Shafor in 1980, is on display at the EAA Airventure Museum in Oshkosh, Wisconsin.

Specifications (Ganagobie 05)

References

External links
Ganagobie Story

Homebuilt aircraft